Fregenia is a monotypic snout moth genus described by Friedrich Hartig in 1948. Its only member, Fregenia prolai, is found in Italy. The type locality is Fregene.

References

Anerastiini
Endemic fauna of Italy
Monotypic moth genera
Moths of Europe
Pyralidae genera